Damyang Guk clan is one of the Korean clans. Their Bon-gwan is in Damyang County, South Jeolla Province. According to the research held in 2015, the number of Damyang Guk clan’s member was 19089. Their founder was  who was a Dafu in Song dynasty. When Emperor Qinzong in Song dynasty revolted against Jin dynasty (1115–1234), he exiled himself to Goryeo in 1128. Then, Jin dynasty conquered Song dynasty, and Jin dynasty extorted connection and tribute. Injong of Goryeo handled this issue appointing  as envoy and dispatched  to demand the connection was unfair, so  went back and forth between Goryeo and Jin dynasty.  demanded it because of an order from the king. As a result, Injong of Goryeo became Prince of Chuseong. Then, he founded Damyang Guk clan and made Damyang, Damyang Guk clan’s Bon-gwan.

See also 
 Korean clan names of foreign origin

References

External links 
 

Guk clans
Korean clan names of Chinese origin
Clans based in Damyang